Taekwondo at the 2011 All-Africa Games in Maputo, Mozambique was held on September 14–17, 2011.

Medal summary

Men

Women

Medals table

References

2011 All-Africa Games
All-Africa Games
2011